Toon City is a Filipino animation studio located in Manila. Its primary contractor is The Walt Disney Company and its DisneyToon Studios division, which produces animated TV series and direct-to-video films. They have also done a few commercials and several direct-to-video work for Nickelodeon, Universal, Warner Bros., HBO and Cinegroupe.

Toon City was founded in 1993 by Colin Baker with roughly ten animators. Their first series work was for Bonkers. Since then, it has gained employees and worked on nearly every recent animated Disney TV series, including Kim Possible and Brandy & Mr. Whiskers.
Recently completed part of the French feature Titeuf, Voltron Force.
The studio currently has a floor space of over 3000M2 and can accommodate over one thousand artists producing
the animation in traditional 2D, Flash, CGI and paperless Harmony.

Toon City Animation Studios in Manila, Philippines of staff layouts and animators included Archie Bolina, Gener De Ocampo, Jerome Hiram Co, Jocelyn Sy, Jonathan Tinsay, Nowell Villano, Romy Garcia and Royce Ramos, projects of its both direct-to-video animated film produced by Walt Disney Television Animation and DisneyToon Studios: Mickey's House of Villains produced by The Walt Disney Company and distributed by Walt Disney Studios Motion Pictures, Mickey, Donald, Goofy: The Three Musketeers, Mickey's Magical Christmas: Snowed in at the House of Mouse, and The Fox and the Hound 2. The followed to the last DisneyToon Studios Australia, the movie The Little Mermaid 3: Ariel's Beginning, produced by DisneyToon Studios. The Jungle Book 2, animation production by Disney Animation Australia and Walt Disney Feature Animation Paris, produced by DisneyToon Studios, and Piglet's Big Movie, animation production by Walt Disney Animation (Japan), Inc., Japan and Toon City Animation, Inc., Manila, Philippines.

List of animated films and TV series
Toon City has provided animation for:

TV series

Feature films (1997, TFC Trickompany Filmproduktion GmbH)The Jungle Book 2 (2003, DisneyToon Studios)Piglet's Big Movie (2003, DisneyToon Studios) (uncredited)Teacher's Pet (2004, Walt Disney Television Animation)Curious George (2006, Universal Animation Studios) (Digital Ink and Paint only)Santa's Apprentice (2010, Cartoon Salon)Titeuf, le film (2011, MoonScoop Productions)The Golden Horse (2014, Acme Film)Henry and Me (2014, Sunset Studios)La Leyenda del Chupacabras (2016, Ánima Estudios)

Direct-to-video filmsBelle's Magical World (1998, Walt Disney Television Animation)The Lion King II: Simba's Pride (1998, Walt Disney Television Animation)Hercules: Zero to Hero (1999, Walt Disney Television Animation)Mickey's Magical Christmas: Snowed in at the House of Mouse (2001, Walt Disney Television Animation)Tarzan & Jane (2002, Walt Disney Television Animation)Mickey's House of Villains (2002, Walt Disney Television Animation)Atlantis: Milo's Return (2003, Walt Disney Television Animation)Winnie the Pooh: Springtime with Roo (2004, DisneyToon Studios)Bratz the Video: Starrin' & Stylin (2004, MGA Entertainment)Mickey, Donald, Goofy: The Three Musketeers (2004, DisneyToon Studios)Tom and Jerry: Blast Off to Mars (2005, Warner Bros. Animation) Tarzan II (2005, DisneyToon Studios)Pooh's Heffalump Halloween Movie (2005, DisneyToon Studios)Kronk's New Groove (2005, DisneyToon Studios)Bah, Humduck! A Looney Tunes Christmas (2006, Warner Bros. Animation)The Fox and the Hound 2 (2006, DisneyToon Studios)Disney Princess Enchanted Tales: Follow Your Dreams (2007, DisneyToon Studios)The Little Mermaid 3: Ariel's Beginning (DisneyToon Studios Australia) (2008, DisneyToon Studios)Holly Hobbie and Friends: Fabulous Fashion Show (2008, Sony Wonder) Holly Hobbie and Friends: Marvelous Makeover (2009, Sony Wonder) Curious George 2: Follow That Monkey! (2009, Universal Animation Studios)

Television specialsBoo to You Too! Winnie the Pooh'' (1996, Disney Television Animation)

References

External links
 
 New version of Tooncity

Animation studios
Entertainment companies of the Philippines
Mass media companies established in 1993
Film production companies of the Philippines
Companies based in Mandaluyong